The Ceibal is a Uruguayan initiative to implement the "One laptop per child" model to introduce Information and Communication Technologies (ICT) in primary education and secondary schools.

In four years Ceibal delivered 450,000 laptops to all students and teachers in the primary education system and no-cost internet access throughout the country. As of 2009, results include increased self-esteem in students, improved motivation of students and teachers, and active participation by parents (94% approve of the plan according to a national survey performed in 2009).

The success of Ceibal is not only due to technological innovations, but also to achievements such as the creation of a training plan for teachers in primary education, the active inclusion of the society and teachers in the project and the successful design and implementation of a monitoring and evaluation model to measure the impact nationally that serves as a guide to define future actions in the plan.

Ceibal emerged as a result of the digital gap that existed in Uruguay between the people who didn't have access to technology and to those who did. It was impelled during Tabaré Vazquez' term of office. Vasquez was the main proponent of this pioneer project; although it was inspired by Nicholas Negroponte's One Laptop per Child project. It raised three principal values: to distribute technology, to promote knowledge and to generate social equity.

The project was named "Ceibal" like the typical Uruguayan tree and flower called "ceibo", known as Cockspur coral tree. Ceibal also stands for "Conectividad Educativa de Informática Básica para el Aprendizaje en Línea" (Educational Connectivity/Basic Computing for Online Learning in English). The OLPC XO-1 computers used in the project are nicknamed "Ceibalitas".

Goals
Ceibal tries to promote digital inclusion and decrease the digital gap that exists among the Uruguayans and between Uruguay and the rest of the world. However, this goal can be accomplished only if it is complemented by an educational plan for teachers, students and their families. The educational plan of Ceibal tries to create the technological resources, the teacher's formation, the creation of suitable content and the social and familiar participation.
Ceibal has strategic principles: equity of knowledge, equal opportunities for children and youth, and the provision of tools to learn not only knowledge given by the school, but also knowledge that the child can learn by him or herself. The original expected outcomes defined the right to have an internet connection at school as well as at home, explicitly ("1.2.3. EXPECTED RESULTS") of.

General
 To improve the quality of education through the new technological system.
 Providing computers to every scholar and teacher of the public education, promote the same opportunities for all.
 To develop a culture based on collaboration between children, a child and teacher, teachers with each other, families and school.
 To promote a sense of criticism of technology on the pedagogical community.
 To provide an internet connection at home as well as at school to all students.

Specific
 To promote the laptops as a useful tool in the schools.
 To offer the teachers a suitable technological and pedagogical formation of the new technologies.
 To produce educational resources, with the new technological tools.
 To inspire an innovational mind of the teachers.
 To assure a good development of the project by a supportive system and technological assistance.
 To involve the parents in the implementation of the project, not only in the schools but also in the houses of the scholars.
 To promote the proportion of relevant information of all the people involved in the project, in order to improve it.

Phases
 To assure a good development of the project by a supportive system and technological assistance.
 To involve the parents in the implementation of the project, not only in the schools but also in the houses of the scholars.
 To promote the proportion of relevant information of all the people involved in the project, in order to improve it.

Stages
2007
In April the presidential decree 144/007 signals the kickoff to provide a laptop to each primary school child and his teacher in every public school, as well as training for its use, and the promotion of educational proposals
In May the pilot phase starts in Villa Cardal (Departamento de Florida), in which 150 students and their teachers participate. Villa Cardal is a town of 1,290 inhabitants and has just one school of 150 students. For this pilot phase laptops were donated by OLPC
In October through an open tender, 100,000 OLPC laptops and 200 servers are awarded
By the end of 2007, all children and teachers from Florida have their laptops.

2008
The XO laptops a tool to appropriate technology" which took place in Colonia del Sacramento (Departamento de Colonia) on 5, 6, and 7 June 2008, in support of Ceibal.

Before the end of the year, more than 175,000 laptops are delivered, completing the whole country with the exception of parts of Canelones, Montevideo and its metropolitan area.
In September Ceibal and Teleton Uruguay signed an agreement that committed Ceibal to adapt its laptops to the needs of children with motor disabilities.
In December the educational portal Ceibal is created.

2009
In April work is started with small companies in the interior of the country to provide decentralized technical support, within the framework of the Rayuela Project with the Inter-American Development Bank and DINAPYME.
In June online courses aimed at students in teacher education are launched in support of the National Administration of Public Education (ANEP)
In the same month, the first national monitoring and evaluation system is developed to work within the Ceibal.
In August laptops are delivered to private schools
In the same month laptops for the visually imparted are delivered
In October the plan is fully covered including Canelones, Montevideo and its metropolitan area, all children and teachers in the country have their own laptops, with a coverage of more than 350,000 children and 16,000 teachers.

2010
In May private companies sponsor Ceibal classrooms in their companies as part of their social responsibility projects
In November the pilot project in robotics is launched
In October Ceibal starts its second phase, delivering laptops to students in secondary schools and to students in technical schools.

2011
In March Ceibal Project starts a new and ambitious phase introducing laptops in nursery schools
In August a television show called "¡Sabelo!" (Know it!) starts. It is a quiz show produced by Ceibal for students in secondary schools.

2012
To celebrate the fifth anniversary of Ceibal a ceremony takes place at Villa Cardal, where it all started. VIDEO 5 años del Plan Ceibal
Ceibal documentary for Austrian public television

2013
 On 2 October, president José Mujica delivered the 1,000,000 computer into an act at Escuela N° 177 (Yugoslavia 307) from Nuevo París, in Montevideo.

Awards
In recognition to Ceibal Project's achievements, it has received various national and international awards:
 Bronze Medal for National Quality and Commitment in Public Management due to Ceibal Project's work in connectivity and connectivity support, National Institute of Quality INACAL, Uruguay, October 2012 INACAL, Uruguay, octubre 2012.
 Frida Award in the category "Access", awarded by LANIC, IDRC and ISCO, Buenos Aires, Argentina October 2011
 First Prize in Development Capacity, awarded by UNDP-United Nations Development Programme for Development at the "Knowledge Fair", Marrakech, Morocco, March 2010
 Prize for Public Management, awarded by RED GEALC-Network of e-government Leaders of Latin America and the Caribbean "ExcelGob08", Montevideo, Uruguay, March 2009
 Special Mention for Ceibal's Commitment with the Millennium Goals, awarded by RED GEALC-Network of e-government Leaders of Latin America and the Caribbean "ExcelGob08", Montevideo, Uruguay, March 2009
 Morosoli Golden Prize to Uruguayan Culture awarded by the Lolita Rubial Foundation. Minas, Uruguay, December 2013

English project

The project Ceibal en Inglés was conceived with the aim to solve the problem of lack of specialized teachers of English in primary schools in the Uruguayan public system of education, with the objective of universalizing the right of every Uruguayan child to acquire a second language through a means that would ensure both quality and sustainability.

Design
The project allows primary school children between fourth and sixth grades to have three 45 minute slots per week of English: one taught by a remote teacher, model of language and in charge of introducing and explaining the linguistic content corresponding to each week through his remote presence via videoconference equipment; and two forty-five-minute slots with the classroom teacher, who following the lesson plans sent to her every week, may review, accompany and guide her students in the learning of English. Lesson plans are associated to digital and non-digital materials, which contain songs, games, videos, etc., so that those contents already presented and explained by the remote teacher, may be revised, reviewed and recycled under the conduction of the classroom teacher. Coherence between remote lessons and face to face lessons is ensured by a half-hour virtual coordination between the two teachers involved in the learning process, in which concerns, learning and teaching styles are discussed.

Each classroom teacher decides whether she wants to participate in this project, she does not need to know any English, but she receives an online course of English so that she can be one step ahead of her students and give them the necessary support.

Pilot phase and expansion
This project was piloted in twenty schools in the country between June and November 2012; five in the south (three in Maldonado and two in Pando, Canelones), and fifteen in the north between Salto and Paysandú, with a total of 37 groups.  The group in the south started on 23 June, and the one in the north on 23 August.

The results of the pilot phase are highly encouraging, for this reason, Ceibal en Inglés has expanded the project to one thousand groups in 2013. Ceibal through an open international bid chose the British Council, a British organization of recorded experience in the teaching of English as a foreign language internationally, as its partner for this project.

On Thursday, 9 January 2014, the BBC Mundo website published an article entitled "Thousands of children in Uruguay learn English with distance teachers". The report highlights the work done by Ceibal and explains that "this is the first time in the world where telepresence technology is used to teach English to large classes of primary school students in the state system", according to Paul Woods, representative of the British Council, the organization providing the teaching materials.

Computing device models 
Since the project's launch up to this day (2020) the Computers that are part of this program keep being improved and changed (the models described on this list do not include much in the way of official names due to lack of documentation)

On-launch Ceibalita 
Also called "Marcianita", this version was very limited with a very slow processor and a total of 300 MB of RAM, the storage was around 1-2 GBs, it was mostly white with green details.

Hardware 
This model was white with a logo on the lid composed of a circle on top of an X, both encrusted on the lid and being of random colors.

It had a green membrane keyboard that was pretty similar to any other laptop keyboard, with the exception of having all the F1 through F12 keys replaced with symbols that indicated their new functions as well as some other minor changes.

It had a simple mouse pad with 2 buttons, one with an X and one with an O as symbols, unlike most modern mousepads, it didn't accept more than one input at once and could not perform gestures like tap-and-hold or double finger swiping.

It had 2 sets of 4 buttons at each side of the screen, with the left one being a single piece d-pad and the other side having 4 buttons, with the symbols X, O, a checkmark symbol and a triangle, these were apparently made for playing games but they were fairly unwieldy due to the screen's width and weight.

It sported 2 speakers, both at the sides of the screen and above each set of buttons, the microphone was located right below the screen, the earphone jack was located at the right border of the case, on the screen's side.

The top left and right of the screen had 2 green antennas that when withdrawn fitted perfectly with the rest of the case, these antennas concealed a pair of USB ports. The computer could not be "closed" without hiding the antennas first.

Software 
The laptop ran sugar, an open source OS based on Linux, which was fairly limited, the programs were called activities, only allowing one to run at the same time.

The computer had 4 sections which were accessed with F1, F2, F3 and F4. These keys had different logos to match all being represented with a black circle and green shapes. F1(community view) had 6 green dots near the border, F2 (group view) had 3 green dots near the center, F3 ?, F4 had a simple green rectangle.

First it had community view, which displayed other laptops of the same kind in the local network represented by the same logo on the lid of the computer, this screen allowed to form groups and perform other cooperative activities, especially inviting others to an activity which allowed more than one user, like the text editor.

Then it had the group view, this showed other computers on the same group, this was not so different from the community view other than trimming the amount of computers on-screen.

The "toolbox" (unknown real name) view had all of the installed activities ready to be launched.

The activity view showed the currently launched activity, this didn't work if no activity had been launched yet.

Buttons F5 to F8 had just black dots of increasing size, F9 to F12 had buttons to adjust volume and screen brightness.

Later models 
As time went on, more improved versions of the ceibalita were made, this also included their hardware which was severely upgraded to fit the new features.

Hardware 
The keyboard was changed to a green plastic one and the mouse was improved to accept most gestures, eventually dropping the F1–F12 special keys, screen resolution was improved, their processor, storage and RAM also had significant upgrades. Later models changed to a blue motif instead of the old green one.

Software 
Sugar was upgraded to allow for more activities open at once between other features, the computer also came with Android installed and eventually also Linux, which could be switched by restarting, changing to sugar didn't require a restart but took a significant amount of time. Sugar was eventually dropped altogether from the latest models.

Tablets 
Usually targeted towards pre-schoolers, these tablets came with Android and a special educative OS with parental restrictions which required completing a simple mathematical operation to unlock.

Conventional laptops 
Eventually, the original model was discontinued and common laptop models were distributed in its stead, these had a significantly more frail case, but their hardware had significant upgrades from the previous models, with storage being increased to 60 GB and getting 2.4 GHz Dual Core CPUs, these computers ditched Android in favor of Windows 10, but kept Linux.

See also
One Laptop per Child#Uruguay

References

External links
 Official Education Web site
 Official Institucional Web site
 Project page on the British Council Uruguay site
 Miguel Brechner in TEDX – Plaza Cibeles
 OLPC Wiki about the project in Uruguay
 Miguel Brechner Frey of Plan CEIBAL speaks about the measurable results of the plan at TEDxBuenosAires, October 2010. Kids, parents and teachers from Escuela 5, Salto, Uruguay appear discussing the impact of the XO on their lives.

Science and technology in Uruguay
Education in Uruguay